The North Fork Malheur River is a  tributary of the Malheur River in eastern Oregon in the United States. Rising in Big Cow Burn in the Blue Mountains, it flows generally south to join the larger river at Juntura. The upper  of the river have been designated Wild and Scenic. This part of the river basin offers camping, hiking, and fishing opportunities in a remote forest setting. The lower river passes through Beulah Reservoir, which stores water for irrigation and has facilities for boaters.

Course
Flowing generally south through the Malheur National Forest, the North Fork receives Horseshoe and Deadhorse creeks from the right, then Flat and Spring creeks from the left, followed by Swamp Creek from the right. Further downstream, Cow, Little Cow, and Sheep creeks enter from the right before Eopian Creek enters from the left and then Short Creek from the right.

Below Short Creek, the river leaves Baker County and enters Grant County. Elk Creek enters from the right and Telephone Gulch from the left before the river reaches North Fork Campground and Stink Creek, which enters from the left. Dugout Creek enters from the left before the river passes under a footbridge carrying a hiking trail running parallel to the stream. Crane Creek enters from the right at Crane Creek Campground. Further downstream, Sage Hen Gulch enters from the left.

Passing through a canyon downstream of Sage Hen Gulch, the river receives Skagway Creek from the left before turning southeast and receiving Bear Creek from the right before leaving Grant County and entering Harney County. Beyond the county boundary Little Malheur River enters from the left. Continuing southeast, the North Fork leaves Harney County and enters Malheur County. Castle Rock Creek enters from the left, and below this the river enters Beulah Reservoir.

As it leaves the reservoir, the river passes a stream gauge at Beulah,  from the mouth. South of the reservoir, Mud Springs and McClellan gulches enter from the right and Whitley Canyon from the left. Cottonwood and Halladay gulches then enter from the right. After entering Juntura Valley, the river receives Kingsbury Gulch from the right and Curry Canyon from the left. Flowing north of and roughly parallel to U.S. Route 20 in the valley, the river turns east as it reaches Juntura and empties into the Malheur River, a tributary of the Snake River.

The first  of the river, from its headwaters to where it leaves the Malheur National Forest, has been protected since 1988 as part of the National Wild and Scenic Rivers System.

Discharge
The United States Geological Survey monitors the flow of the North Fork Malheur River.

Recreation
The North Fork offers opportunities for camping, hiking, and fishing in a remote and scenic setting. North Fork Campground offers tent and trailer camping, and Crane Crossing Campground, which more remote, has tent camping. These campgrounds are primitive; although they have tables, toilets, and firerings, they have no drinkable water.

Further downstream, the Malheur County Parks Department maintains boating facilities at Beulah Reservoir on the North Fork of the Malheur River. Used mainly for irrigation storage, the lake fluctuates in size from season to season; it is generally high in the spring and low in the fall.

The river is a productive trout stream. Great Basin redband trout, rainbow trout, and bull trout inhabit the river above Beulah Reservoir. Fishing is limited to artificial flies and lures, and bull trout, which are threatened, must be released unharmed. The river downstream of the reservoir flows mostly through private ranchland, and access is restricted.

See also
List of longest streams of Oregon
List of National Wild and Scenic Rivers
List of rivers of Oregon

References

External links
 Malheur Watershed Council

Rivers of Malheur County, Oregon
Rivers of Grant County, Oregon
Rivers of Baker County, Oregon
Rivers of Harney County, Oregon
Rivers of Oregon
Wild and Scenic Rivers of the United States